Maqate (also Romanized as Maqāţe‘; also known as Maqāţī‘) is a village in Jazireh-ye Minu Rural District, Minu District, Khorramshahr County, Khuzestan Province, Iran. At the 2006 census, its population was 345, in 71 families.

References 

Populated places in Khorramshahr County